The 2012 Thomas & Uber Cup was the 27th tournament of the Thomas Cup and 24th international badminton tournament of the Uber Cup. It was held from May 20–27, 2012 at the Wuhan Sports Center Stadium in Wuhan, China.

Host city selection
Jakarta (Indonesia) and Wuhan (China) submitted bids for the competition. Wuhan was announced as the host by BWF after a meeting in Qingdao during the 2011 Sudirman Cup.

Qualifiers

Seedings
All the seeding list based on March 1, 2012 world rankings as the draw was conducted on April 15, 2012. The top four seeding teams is in first pot, follow by next four teams in the second pot and the bottom four teams was put in the third pot.

For the knock out draw, to be held immediately after the group stage is completed, the four teams that had topped their group will be ranked according to their world ranking on the 17 May, and the top two seeds would then be separated each into one half. Seeds 3/4 will be drawn into each half, then followed by the remaining 5/8 seeded teams.

Thomas Cup

Uber Cup

Squads

Thomas Cup

Groups

Group A

Group B

Group C

Group D

Knockout stage

All times are Chinese Standard Time (UTC+08:00).

Quarterfinals

Semifinals

Final

Uber Cup

Groups

Group A

Group B

Group C

Group D

Knockout stage

Quarterfinals

Semifinals

Final

References

External links
2012 Thomas and Uber Cups at Badminton World Federation
2012 Thomas & Uber Cup Finals at tournamentsoftware.com

 
International sports competitions hosted by China
Thomas & Uber Cup
2012 in badminton
2012 in Chinese sport
Badminton tournaments in China
Sport in Wuhan